In enzymology, a phenylalanine adenylyltransferase is an enzyme that catalyzes the chemical reaction

ATP + L-phenylalanine  diphosphate + N-adenylyl-L-phenylalanine

Thus, the two substrates of this enzyme are ATP and L-phenylalanine, whereas its two products are diphosphate and N-adenylyl-L-phenylalanine.

This enzyme belongs to the family of transferases, specifically those transferring phosphorus-containing nucleotide groups (nucleotidyltransferases).  The systematic name of this enzyme class is ATP:L-phenylalanine adenylyltransferase. This enzyme is also called L-phenylalanine adenylyltransferase.

References

 

EC 2.7.7
Enzymes of unknown structure